Yang Shisen (born 20 March 1958) is a Chinese fencer. He competed in the team sabre event at the 1984 Summer Olympics.

References

External links
 

1958 births
Living people
Chinese male sabre fencers
Olympic fencers of China
Fencers at the 1984 Summer Olympics